"More Stars" a.k.a. "Stars on 45 Vol. 2" is a song issued in 1981 by the Dutch studio group Stars on 45, in the UK credited to 'Starsound'. It was the follow-up to the US and Dutch #1 and UK #2 single "Stars on 45" (released under its full 41-word title but generally simply known as "Stars on 45 Medley"). "More Stars" was later included on the band's second album Longplay Album - Volume II (US title: Stars on Longplay II, UK title: Stars On 45 - The Album - Volume 2).

The "More Stars" medley featured eight hits by Swedish group ABBA, seven of which already had been UK Top 10 hits; "Voulez-Vous" (#3, 1979) "S.O.S." (#6, 1975), "Money, Money, Money" (#3, 1976), "Fernando" (#1, 1976), "Knowing Me, Knowing You" (#1, 1977), "The Winner Takes It All" (#1, 1980) and "Super Trouper" (#1, 1980). The eighth title chosen for the medley was somewhat surprisingly "Bang-A-Boomerang", one of ABBA's lesser known tracks and indeed only released as a single in one country; France. The eight minute plus album version of the ABBA medley which was released on CD on the 2011 30th anniversary best of CD added another seven titles; "Dum Dum Diddle", "Lay All Your Love on Me", "On and On and On", "Super Trouper" (reprise), "Summer Night City", "Gimme! Gimme! Gimme! (A Man After Midnight)" and "Stars On 45 (2)" (reprise).

The near twelve-minute 12" mix of "More Stars" started with another, notably different medley, mainly featuring American 60s and 70s hits from the soul, R&B and folk rock genres by among others The Temptations, Smokey Robinson & The Miracles, Four Tops, The Supremes, The Mamas & the Papas, Neil Diamond and Simon & Garfunkel. This medley was later also included on the Longplay Album - Volume II in slightly re-edited form preceding the "Supremes Medley" on that album.

"More Stars" became Stars on 45/Starsound's second single to peak at #2 on the UK charts and indeed a Top 10 single in most parts of Europe. In the US, where ABBA's popularity wasn't on the same scale as in Europe, Radio Records instead chose an edit of the first part of the 12" mix, starting with "Papa Was A Rolling Stone" as a single, and released it as the follow-up to the second Beatles medley "Stars on 45 Medley 2", but under the same title; "More Stars" (#55, Billboard'''s Hot 100).

Track listing 7" single
Side A
"More Stars" (7" Mix) - 4:42All tracks written by Benny Andersson and Björn Ulvaeus unless otherwise noted''

 "Stars On 45 (2)" (Eggermont, Duiser)
 "Voulez-Vous"
 "SOS" (Andersson, Anderson, Ulvaeus)
 "Bang-A-Boomerang" (Andersson, Anderson, Ulvaeus)
 "Money, Money, Money"
 "Knowing Me, Knowing You" (Andersson, Anderson, Ulvaeus)
 "Fernando" (Andersson, Anderson, Ulvaeus)
 "The Winner Takes It All"
 "Super Trouper"
 "Stars On 45" (Eggermont, Duiser)

Side B
"'45 Stars Get Ready" (7" Mix) (Eggermont, Duiser) - 3:08

Track listing 12" single

Side A
"More Stars" (12" Mix) - 11:53

 "Stars On 45 (2)" (Eggermont, Duiser)
 "Papa Was A Rollin' Stone" (Whitfield)
 "Dance to the Music" (Stone)
 "Sugar Baby Love" (Bickerton, Waddington)
 "Papa Was A Rollin' Stone" (Whitfield)
 "Let's Go to San Francisco" (Carter, Lewis)
 "A Horse with No Name" (Bunnell)
 "Monday, Monday" (Philips)
 "San Francisco (Be Sure to Wear Flowers in Your Hair)" (Philips)
 "California Dreamin'" (Philips, Philips)
 "Eve of Destruction" (Sloan)
 "The Tears of a Clown" (Cosby, Robinson)
 "Stop! In The Name Of Love" (Holland, Dozier, Holland)
 "Cracklin' Rosie" (Diamond)
 "Do Wah Diddy Diddy" (Barry, Greenwich)
 "A Lover's Concerto" (Linzer, Randell)
 "Reach Out I'll Be There" (Holland, Dozier, Holland)
 "The Sounds of Silence" (Simon)
 "Stars On 45 (2)" (Eggermont, Duiser)
 "Voulez-Vous" (Andersson, Ulvaeus)
 "SOS" (Andersson, Anderson, Ulvaeus)
 "Bang-A-Boomerang" (Andersson, Anderson, Ulvaeus)
 "Money, Money, Money" (Andersson, Ulvaeus)
 "Knowing Me, Knowing You" (Andersson, Anderson, Ulvaeus)
 "Fernando" (Andersson, Anderson, Ulvaeus)
 "The Winner Takes It All" (Andersson, Ulvaeus)
 "Super Trouper" (Andersson, Ulvaeus)
 "Stars On 45" (Eggermont, Duiser)

Side B
"'45 Stars Get Ready" (12" Mix) (Eggermont, Duiser) - 4:02

Chart peaks

Weekly charts

Year-end charts

Sales and certifications

Sources and external links
 
 
 Rateyourmusic.com biography and discography
 The Dutch Stars on 45 fansite
 Top4000.nl
 UK Top 40
 Irish Charts.ie
 AustrianCharts.at
 Hitparade.ch, Switzerland
 NorwegianCharts.com
 SwedishCharts.com
 West German charts

References

Songs about musicians
1981 singles
Stars on 45 songs
CNR Music singles
CBS Records singles
European Hot 100 Singles number-one singles
Number-one singles in Switzerland
Music medleys